= In the Depths of Our Hearts =

1920 American film

In the Depths of Our Hearts is an American film produced in 1920 by the Royal Gardens Film Company of Chicago. The film was made in Chicago and on a farm in Wisconsin and features an African American cast. It is considered a lost film. It depicts a story of love separated because of skin tone. The film was positively reviewed by the Chicago Defender, which praised its dramatic qualities and its action scenes.

Royal Gardens Film Company was reported to have made two other films including a comedy before folding.

== Cast ==
- Herman DeLavalade
- Augusta Williams
- Irene Conn
- Virgil Williams
- Charles H. Allen
